St. Mother Teresa Catholic Academy (SMTCA, St. Mother Teresa, SMT, Mother Teresa, or Teresa for short); also known as by its former names Blessed Mother Teresa Catholic Secondary School before 2016 and Mother Teresa Catholic Secondary School in its inception is a Catholic secondary school in Toronto, Ontario, Canada. It serves the Malvern neighbourhood of Scarborough.

History

The founder of Missionaries of Charity

Mother Teresa of Calcutta founded the a Roman Catholic religious congregation, Missionaries of Charity, which in 2012 consisted of over 4,500 sisters and is active in 133 countries. Members of the order must adhere to the vows of chastity, poverty and obedience, and the fourth vow, to give "Wholehearted and Free service to the poorest of the poor". The Missionaries of Charity at the time of her death had 610 missions in 123 countries including hospices and homes for people with HIV/AIDS, leprosy and tuberculosis; soup kitchens; children's and family counselling programmes; orphanages; and schools. For over 45 years, she ministered to the poor, sick, orphaned, and dying, while guiding the Missionaries of Charity's expansion, first throughout India and then in other countries. Her beatification by Pope John Paul II following her death gave her the title "Blessed Teresa of Calcutta".

She was the recipient of numerous honours including the 1979 Nobel Peace Prize. She refused the conventional ceremonial banquet given to laureates, and asked that the $192,000 funds be given to the poor in India. Her awards include the first Pope John XXIII Peace Prize, the Philippines-based Ramon Magsaysay Award, the Pacem in Terris Award, an honorary Companion of the Order of Australia, the Order of Merit from both the United Kingdom and the United States, Albania's Golden Honour of the Nation, honorary degrees, the Balzan Prize, and the Albert Schweitzer International Prize among many others.

In late 2003, she was beatified, the third step toward possible sainthood. A second miracle credited to Mother Teresa is required before she can be recognised as a saint by the Catholic Church.

Foundings

After the construction of several subdivisions in the Malvern area in the 1970s, Lester B. Pearson Collegiate Institute, the high school in that area, was opened in 1978.

In its conception, on September 3, 1985, a new school in the Scarborough area of Toronto was to be named Mary Ward. Then trustee Harold Adams advocated for the new school to be named Mother Teresa Catholic Secondary School. Another school was built later, and that received the name Mary Ward Catholic Secondary School. The ideals of the school's patroness and namesake, Mother Teresa, became the inspiration for the school's motto. The school led by George Iantorno the founding principal; consisted of Andy Fedak, its vice principal; secretary Sue Niven-Smith, ten staff (5 male, 5 female), and approximately 150 grade 9 students.

The first four years was also known as the “Tin Can” experience because the school resided in relocatables and a port-o-pac located on Invergordon Avenue, close to the then newly opened St. Elizabeth Seton Elementary School and the new expansionist era, which began with year five in 1989-90. A school filled with 650 students left the port-o-pac rooms and soon moved into the new structure of 984 pupils and doubled its enrolment. Mother Teresa's new facility was officially opened and blessed on April 29, 1990.

As a result of the beatification, the board changed the school's name to Blessed Mother Teresa in 2003. Her subsequent canonization and enrollment increase attempt led the board to rebrand the school as St. Mother Teresa Catholic Academy in October 2016.

Location and community

54 Ethnic minorities are represented in its student population, reflecting the diverse Malvern community that the school serves.

SMT stands at the corner of Sewells Road and McLevin Road, off Neilson Road between Sheppard Avenue East and Finch Avenue East. It is beside the Malvern Community and Recreational Centre, which also houses the Malvern Branch of the Toronto Public Library.

Overview
The facility has unique features such as the large, very attractive, naturally well-lit atrium centerpiece and has the mini quad.

Academics
Courses taught at the school follow the Ontario Curriculum for Grades 9 through 12.

Athletics
St. Mother Teresa has received a brand new track and sports equipment courtesy of Nike. This track had brought the community together. The first event celebrated in 2007 was the Terry Fox Run. It was a great success and we were able to raise a grand total of $3000 to help find a cure for cancer.

Called the Titans, there are list of sports that are offered at St. Mother Teresa:
 Junior Boys Basketball
 Girls Basketball
 Senior Boys Basketball - 2nd place at the AAAA OFSAA championship in 2005, and 1st at the AAAA OFSAA championship in 2006
 Junior Girls Volleyball
 Senior Girls Volleyball
 Junior Boys Volleyball
 Senior Boys Volleyball
 Junior Boys Soccer
 Senior Boys Soccer
 Badminton
 Table Tennis
 Track and Field - sending kids to OFSAA every year since 2008 to the present
 Cross Country

See also
List of high schools in Ontario

References

External links
St. Mother Teresa Catholic Academy
TCDSB Portal

Toronto Catholic District School Board
Educational institutions established in 1985
High schools in Toronto
Education in Scarborough, Toronto
Catholic secondary schools in Ontario
1985 establishments in Ontario
Memorials to Mother Teresa